Air Comet Chile was an airline based in Santiago, Chile, operating domestic passenger services. Its main base was Comodoro Arturo Merino Benítez International Airport, Santiago.

History
The airline was founded as Aerolíneas del Sur in 2004 by Grupo Marsans and started operations in December 2004, after receiving approval from the Chilean civil aviation authorities in November 2004. It is wholly owned by Grupo Marsans. In the Fourth Quarter of 2007 it was renamed Air Comet Chile, acting as the sister airline of the Spanish airline Air Comet. It was at that time Chile's third biggest airline.

The airline ceased operation on October 31, 2008, and filed for bankruptcy protection on December 18, 2008.  Some of Air Comet Chile airplanes are operated now by Aerolínea Principal.

Destinations
Air Comet Chile operated services from Santiago to the following domestic destinations (as of October 2008):

Puerto Montt
Punta Arenas

Fleet
The Air Comet Chile fleet consisted of the following aircraft (as of 12 September 2008):

3 Boeing 737-200

As of 8 November 2008, the average age of the Air Comet Chile fleet was 27.7 years.

References

External links

Air Comet Chile
Air Comet Chile Fleet

Aerolíneas Argentinas
Defunct airlines of Chile
Airlines established in 2004
Airlines disestablished in 2008
2004 establishments in Chile
2008 disestablishments in Chile
Chilean companies established in 2004